Covert Action (originally released as Sono Stato un Agente C.I.A.) is a 1978 Italian/Greek co-production Eurospy film starring the American actor David Janssen.

The plot was based on the experiences of former CIA agent Philip Agee who initiated a lawsuit with the producers over his fees and expenses.

Plot
A former CIA agent decides to write about his CIA career that leads him into danger.

Production
The original female lead Catherine Bach dropped out and was replaced with Corinne Cléry. Due to a then new Italian ordinance that prohibited the firing of firearms in Italian movies, gunfire scenes were filmed in Greece.

Cast
David Janssen ... Lester Horton
Arthur Kennedy ... CIA Chief of Station, Athens
Maurizio Merli ... John Florio
Corinne Cléry ... Anne Florio
Philippe Leroy ... Greek Inspector
Ivan Rassimov ... The Silent
Giacomo Rossi-Stuart ... Grant

References

External links

1978 films
Italian spy action films
English-language Italian films
English-language Greek films
1970s English-language films
1970s Italian-language films
1970s spy action films
Films about the Central Intelligence Agency
Films directed by Romolo Guerrieri
Films scored by Stelvio Cipriani
1970s Italian films